Michal Kolomazník (born 20 July 1976) is a Czech former professional footballer who played as a striker. He played three matches for the Czech Republic national team. He won the Czech Cup with FK Teplice in 2003.

Kolomazník retired from his playing career following repeated problems with a knee injury. His last club was FK Dukla Prague.

References

External links
 
 Michal Kolomazník Profile at idnes.cz 

1976 births
Living people
Footballers from Brno
Czech footballers
Association football forwards
Czech Republic international footballers
Czech Republic youth international footballers
Czech Republic under-21 international footballers
Czech First League players
2. Bundesliga players
FC Zbrojovka Brno players
1. SC Znojmo players
FK Teplice players
SSV Jahn Regensburg players
TSV 1860 Munich players
SpVgg Unterhaching players
FK Dukla Prague players
Czech expatriate footballers
Czech expatriate sportspeople in Germany
Expatriate footballers in Germany
SK Slavia Prague (women) managers